The Charles P. Adams House is a historic house located at 549 Main Street in Grambling, Louisiana.

Built in 1936, it is a -story cottage with some aspects of Bungalow architecture, located just south of the Grambling State University campus. It was donated by the family of Charles P. Adams to the university in 1979. It is notable as the "only surviving structure directly associated with the founder of Grambling State University".

The house was listed on the National Register of Historic Places on February 23, 1996.

See also
 National Register of Historic Places listings in Lincoln Parish, Louisiana

References

Houses on the National Register of Historic Places in Louisiana
Houses completed in 1936
Lincoln Parish, Louisiana
Grambling State University
National Register of Historic Places in Lincoln Parish, Louisiana
1936 establishments in Louisiana